Citizen King was an American music group from Milwaukee, Wisconsin, whose style was a mix of hip-hop, soul, and punk.

History
The band formed in 1993 after the breakup of their previous band, Wild Kingdom. Both bands received a lot of local recognition for their live shows. While Citizen King's first LP and EP were only commercial successes around Wisconsin, they were well received by critics. They were discovered by Speech from Arrested Development, who produced several tracks on their debut album Brown Bag. They followed up with the EP Count the Days.

They toured with Fishbone, and executives at Warner Bros. Records signed them after attending their show at the South by Southwest convention. The band's 1999 release Mobile Estates received moderate commercial success. The album's hit song "Better Days (And the Bottom Drops Out)" was played in the pilot episode and the series finale of Malcolm in the Middle.

Their first single and biggest hit was "Better Days (And The Bottom Drops Out)." It became a Top 40 hit and went gold in the summer of 1999. The band performed as part of Humble & Fred Fest at Fort York in Toronto that year.

A remix of "Better Days (And The Bottom Drops Out)" was used in the 2000 movie Gone in 60 Seconds, and the original version was used in the video game, Street Sk8er 2, along with "Under the Influence". "Salt Bag Spill" was featured on The Animal soundtrack in 2001. The band was managed by Jeff Castelaz, who later founded Dangerbird Records, and continues to manage keyboardist Dave Cooley in his work as a producer and mixer.

Despite the success of the album and the high charting Better Days, plus the constant touring, the band's popularity eventually dropped off. Citizen King disbanded in 2002.

Cooley continued his career as a producer and has produced records for such artists as Silversun Pickups, Local Natives, Eulogies, Darker My Love and The Polyphonic Spree. Cooley also became a mastering engineer for Stones Throw Records, overseeing most of the albums by J Dilla and the label's founder Peanut Butter Wolf.

Personnel 
Mount Sims – lead vocals (1993–2002), bass (1997–2002)
Kristian Riley – guitar (1993–2002)
Dave Cooley – keyboards (1993–2002)
Malcolm Michiles – turntables (1993–2002)
Gintas Janusonis - drums (1993-1994)
DJ Brooks – drums (1994–2002)
Sage Schwarm – bass (1993–1995)
John Dominguez - bass (1995)
Cory Coleman – bass (1995–1997)

Discography

Albums 
Brown Bag LP (1995)
Mobile Estates (March 9, 1999), peaked on Billboard's Heatseekers chart at

Extended plays 
Sydney Hih (1997) (collection of demos and b-sides from 1993-1996)
Count The Days (April 2, 1996)

Singles

References

External links 
VH1 article
Burst Collective article

Musical groups established in 1993
Musical groups from Wisconsin
1993 establishments in Wisconsin
Musical groups disestablished in 2002
Musicians from Milwaukee